Stephenson is an unincorporated community in Wyoming County, West Virginia, United States. Part of the community was known as Devils Fork until 1935. The community was named after W. G. Stephenson, a mining official.

Stephenson has a post office, with the ZIP code 25928.

References

External links 
West Virginia Place Names

Unincorporated communities in West Virginia
Unincorporated communities in Wyoming County, West Virginia
Coal towns in West Virginia
Populated places on the Guyandotte River